Sangar-e Chanibeh-ye Do (also Romanized as Sangar-e Chanībeh-ye Do; also known as Sangar, Sangar-e Chanībeh, and Sangarīyeh-e Kheybeh-e Do) is a village in Shoaybiyeh-ye Sharqi Rural District, Shadravan District, Shushtar County, Khuzestan Province, Iran. As of the 2006 census, its population was 280, consisting of 41 families.

References 

Populated places in Shushtar County